Suicide City is an American punk rock band from Brooklyn, New York City, founded in 2005. The band's lineup consisted of lead vocalist Karl Bernholtz, producer and guitarist Billy Graziadei, lead guitarist AJ Marchetta, bassist Jennifer Arroyo and drummer Danny Lamagna.

History 
The group began when producer Billy Graziadei sent some songs to singer Karl Bernholtz after working with him on his band The Groovnicks. The two quickly got on and brought in Guitarist AJ Marchetta and Drummer Danny Lamagna. Bassist Jennifer Arroyo soon joined the group to round out Suicide City! They self-released the EP Not My Year in 2005, selling 7,000 copies without label support. They have also self-produced and released a live DVD entitled Live from CBGB.

On August 4, 2009, Suicide City released their debut full-length effort, Frenzy, via Brooklyn label The End Records. "'Frenzy' is such an eclectic blend of music," said Marchetta. "This band is unafraid and unapologetic about what we create, and because of that we have an album with a really wide musical landscape." Graziadei points out, "In our short time together, Suicide City has achieved more on our own than most bands do in their whole career with the help of a label." Benholtz described it as follows: "Suicide City thrives on making people happy and smile through our music without having to candy coat anything. Life does not 'suck and then you die.' Life is great, dangerous, exciting, strange, and then you die. I guess that's what we're trying to portray with our music." Graziadei soon after left Suicide City to focus on his band “Biohazard”

Hiatus and reunion 
In 2011, after a one-year hiatus, the band returned as a four-piece consisting of Bernholtz, Lamagna, Marchetta and Arroyo.

Touring 
The band has made numerous trips around the United States while touring with Mindless Self Indulgence, Gwar, Otep, Life of Agony, Taking Back Sunday, and Glenn Danzig.

The band toured Brazil with MxPx and co-headlined the Maquinaria Rock Fest alongside Sepultura, the Misfits, and Suicidal Tendencies on May 18, 2008. In November 2008, Live from CBGB was released featuring Suicide City's performance at CBGB, filmed shortly before the venue's closure. Suicide City signed to The End Records in the summer of 2009.

Suicide City played their last live show February 11, 2010, before going on a hiatus. Exactly one year later, on February 11, 2011, the band reunited, with the exception of Graziadei, to perform at the Highline Ballroom in New York City.

Band members 

Current members
 Karl Bernholtz – lead vocals, rhythm guitar (2005–present)
 AJ Marchetta – lead guitar, backing vocals  (2005–present)
 Jennifer Arroyo – bass  (2005–present)
 Danny Lamagna – drums, percussion (2005–present)

Former members
 Billy Graziadei – rhythm guitar, backing vocals (2005–2011)

Discography 
Not My Year (EP) (2005)
Frenzy (2009)

Videos 
Live from CBGB DVD (2008)

Other work 
Suicide City was featured on the "More and Faster" mix of Mindless Self Indulgence's "Straight to Video", which appears on that band's "Shut Me Up" single.

References 

Horror punk groups
American industrial rock musical groups
Musical groups established in 2005
Musical groups disestablished in 2010
Musical groups from Brooklyn
Punk rock groups from New York (state)